Barnet Baff (c. 1863 – November 24, 1914) was a poultry dealer in New York City who was murdered by  organized crime that represented the "poultry trust" in New York that extorted $10 per truckload of poultry from merchants. His death led to an investigation of organized crime in New York City and led to the resignation of Captain John McClintock.

Joseph Cohen was convicted of first degree murder and Abraham "Abie" Graff was convicted of manslaughter in the trial before Justice Tompkins.

References

Further reading
 Staff (August 20, 1914). "Victim of Trade Rivals". The Muscatine News Tribune. p.6.
 Bonnie Quint Kaplan. "Barnett Baff And The Everlasting Murder Case" Rockport, MA : Quint Publications, (2013, 2009) 
 David J. Krajicek (Aug 01, 2015) "Dead man squawking: How NYC's kosher chicken king's luck ran out" NEW YORK DAILY NEWS

People murdered by Italian-American organized crime
People murdered by Jewish-American organized crime
1914 deaths
Businesspeople from New York City
People murdered in New York City
Male murder victims
American murder victims
1914 murders in the United States
Year of birth uncertain